"A Full Time Job" is a song written by Gerry Teifer, sung by Eddy Arnold, and released on the RCA Victor label (catalog no. 20-4787). In July 1952, it peaked at No. 1 on Billboards country and western jockey chart (No. 3 best seller and juke box). It spent 18 weeks on the charts and was ranked No. 15 on Billboards 1952 year-end country and western best seller chart and No. 21 on the year-end juke box chart.

See also
 Billboard Top Country & Western Records of 1952

References

Eddy Arnold songs
1952 songs